Trifolium montanum, the mountain clover, is a plant species of the genus Trifolium. It is the county flower of Oslo, Norway.

References

Trifolium montanum at Quattrofolium

montanum
Plants described in 1753
Taxa named by Carl Linnaeus